is a former Japanese football player and manager. He managed Guam national football team.

Playing career
Uchida was born in Shizuoka on April 18, 1962. He started his career in football as a player for Shimizu Higashi High School where he won the National Sports Festival of Japan with them as well as coming runners-up in the All Japan High School Soccer Tournament in 1980. With these achievements he progressed his career at Komazawa University before he joined local football team Shimizu. While at Shimizu he continued his studies at University of Tokyo to become a coach in physical exercise.

Coaching career
Uchida gained his first major coaching role at JEF United Ichihara on January 1, 1994 where he was the club's chief instructor. On December 31, 2003 he left the club and joined Vegalta Sendai where he initially started as deputy general manager. On March 1, 2004 he accepted an assistant coaching role for the Japan U-17 national team on a part-time basis. This lasted until 2007, when he left the Japanese team and concentrated on Vegalta Sendai where he moved to become their training director and then youth development director.      

On January 1, 2010 Uchida became the manager of J2 League team Ventforet Kofu. At the end of the 2010 season he led the team to second within the division and promotion to the top tier.

On December 22, 2015 Uchida joined third tier Chinese club Yinchuan Helanshan for the start of the 2016 China League Two season.

Managerial statistics

References

External links

1962 births
Living people
Komazawa University alumni
Association football people from Shizuoka Prefecture
Japanese footballers
Japanese football managers
Japanese expatriate football managers
J2 League managers
Ventforet Kofu managers
Guam national football team managers
Expatriate football managers in China
Association footballers not categorized by position
Japanese expatriate sportspeople in Guam
Japanese expatriate sportspeople in China